Davidov, or Davidova (feminine; Давыдова), also sometimes transliterated as Davydov/Davydova, is a surname common in Russia among Jewish and non-Jewish people, in high frequently among Mountain Jews, meaning "son of David", and can refer to:

People
 Denis Davydov (1774–1838), Russia guerilla officer and poet
 August Davidov (1823–1885), Russian mathematician and pedagogue, brother of Karl Davidov
 Karl Davydov (1838–1889), Russian cellist, conductor, composer, and pedagogue, brother of August Davidov
 Alexei Davidov (1867–1940), Russian cellist, composer, and businessman, son of August Davidov
 Milan Davidov, (1863–1903) Bulgarian independence fighter (for Macedonia)
 Lado Davidov (1924–1987), Soviet soldier, Hero of the Soviet Union.
 Marv Davidov (1931–2012), American peace activist and founder of the Honeywell Project
 Dmitry Davydov (filmmaker) (born 1983), Russian

Athletes
 Vitali Davydov (born 1939), Russian footballer
 Ivan Davidov (1943–2015), Bulgarian footballer
 Evgeny Davydov (born 1967), Russian ice hockey player
 Dmitri Anatolyevich Davydov (born 1975), Russian footballer
 Dmitry Alexeyevich Davydov (born 1978), Russian footballer
 Shani Bloch-Davidov (born 1979), Israeli Olympic racing cyclist
 Milan Davidov (born 1978), Serbian footballer
 Pāvels Davidovs (born 1980), Latvian footballer

Other uses
 Davidov (municipality), a village and municipality in Slovakia
 Davidov Stradivarius, a cello once owned by Karl Davidov, built in 1712 by Antonio Stradivari.
 Davidov Spur, a ridge in Antarctica

See also
 Davidoff, a surname
 Davydov, a surname

Jewish surnames
Surnames from given names